Théo Fernandez (born in Toulouse on 18 September 1998) is a French film actor. He is best known for playing the role of Donald Tuche in Les Tuche (2011), Les Tuche 2 - Le rêve américain (2016) and Les Tuche 3 (2018). He plays the lead role of Gaston in the 2018 film , the main character in the comics Gaston created by the Belgian cartoonist André Franquin. Fernandez has also appeared in a number of TV films and TV series.

References

External links

Living people
1998 births
French male film actors
Male actors from Toulouse